Vaka katea are the traditional sailing double canoe watercraft of the Cook Islands.

See also 
 Rarotonga

References 

Multihulls
Canoes